Sayyid Ali bin Hamud al-Busaidi (7 June 1884 – 20 December 1918), also known as Ali II, was the eighth Sultan of Zanzibar from 1902 to 1911.

Biography
Ali was proclaimed Sultan of Zanzibar on 20 July 1902, following the death of his father, the seventh Sultan, two days earlier. There was a regency until he attained majority. He served only a few years as sultan because of illness. On 9 December 1911 he abdicated in favour of his brother-in-law Khalifa bin Harub Al-Busaid.

References

1884 births
1918 deaths
Al Said dynasty
Monarchs who abdicated
Ali bin Hamud
Knights Grand Cross of the Order of the Immaculate Conception of Vila Viçosa
Burials at Père Lachaise Cemetery
Zanzibari royalty
19th-century Arabs
20th-century Arabs
19th-century Omani people
20th-century Omani people